Liam Waite (born Liam Owen East; March 20, 1971) is an American actor. He is the stepson of Ralph Waite. He is known for portraying a Mars Police Force Officer in John Carpenter's ‘’Ghost Of Mars’’ & portraying a father figure in television's ‘’Ghost Whisperer’’.

Early life
Born Liam Owen East took the last name 'Waite' from film producer and actor, Ralph Waite, his stepfather. He studied acting with under Arthur Mendoza at Actors Circle Theatre.

Personal life
Waite was in a relationship with actress Natasha Henstridge from 1996 to 2004. The couple had two children together, Tristan River (b. 1998) and Asher Sky (b. 2001).

Filmography

Film
 Ghosts of Mars (2001)
 Second Skin (2000)
 Civility (2000)
 Simpatico (1999)

Television
 McBride (2006)
 Ghost Whisperer (2006)
 Vampire Bats (2005)
 Blessings (2003)
 She Spies (2003)
 King of Texas (2002)

Theatre
 Equus (1995) - Palm Springs

References

External links

1971 births
Living people
American male film actors
American male television actors
Male actors from Boston
Place of birth missing (living people)